Widya Mandala Catholic University, commonly abbreviated as WMCU is a major oldest and largest private Roman Catholic university in Indonesia, located in the heart of Darmo District in Surabaya, East Java - Indonesia.

Widya Mandala Catholic University ranks at the top of Indonesia's private universities fields of study and distinguished alumni. According to the Department of Higher Education, the university appears in the Top 50 Promising Indonesian Universities.

Widya Mandala Catholic University is especially known for its academic excellence in the fields of Accounting, Food Technology, Chemical Engineering, Pharmacy, Management, and the Doctoral (Ph.D) program in Management. The university is owned by the Roman Catholic Diocese of Surabaya and is being managed by the Diocese under the Widya Mandala Foundation.

History
The idea of establishing a Catholic Higher Education Foundation has been started since World War I around 1914-1919. At that time, many HBS (Hogere Burger School) graduates, were unable to continue their higher education to the Netherlands, due to circumstances and transportation barriers to Europe.

Then the 1950s became known as the "Catholic College Awakening Era". In 1958, after the establishment of several Catholic universities in Indonesian cities, Mgr. J. Klooster, CM as the Bishop of Surabaya founded the Widya Mandala Foundation.

Widya Mandala comes from the ancient Javanese language; Mandala means building or place in the sense not only physical and Widya means scholar. So Widya Mandala can be interpreted as a place of education for wise and successful people (scholars). Some people also simplify the meaning of Widya Mandala as a place or container of knowledge.

The Widya Mandala Surabaya Foundation aims to participate in educating the life of the Indonesian nation by organizing, maintaining and developing Higher Education in order to form Indonesian people who are moral and educated and highly knowledgeable.

September 20, 1960 was designated as the anniversary of Widya Mandala Catholic University Surabaya (UKWMS). When it was founded, UKWMS only had one faculty and was located at Jalan Dr. Soetomo, Surabaya. Now there are ten faculties, postgraduate programs (S2 and S3), as well as a Secretarial Academy (D3). The activities of the Widya Mandala Catholic University in Surabaya are outlined in the form of the Tri Dharma of Higher Education which consists of Education and Teaching, Research, and Community Service.

As one of the oldest private universities in Surabaya, UKWMS has four campus buildings to support the teaching and learning process. The main campus is located on Jalan Dinoyo 42, inhabited by the Business Faculty, the Communication Science Faculty and the Agricultural Technology Faculty. The second campus is located on Jalan Kalijudan 38, inhabited by the Faculty of Engineering and the Faculty of Teacher Training & Education. The third campus is located on Jalan Dinoyo 48, inhabited by the Postgraduate Program. The newest campus building which was inaugurated in 2013 is the Integrated and Comprehensive Health Sciences Campus and is located on Jalan Kalisari Selatan 7 in the Pakuwon City complex. Carrying integrated learning methods across health sciences; on this fourth campus there are the Faculty of Pharmacy, the Faculty of Psychology, the Faculty of Nursing, the Faculty of Philosophy, and the Faculty of Medicine.

Locations
Widya Mandala Catholic University has four campuses in the city of Surabaya and one in Madiun, Indonesia.

 The first campus in Dinoyo quite strategic. Its existence in the middle of the city of Surabaya makes the campus easy to reach either by public transportation from any side. The location is also close to business centers, such as the WTC, Tunjungan Business Center, Tunjungan Plaza, Royal Plaza, Hotels, and Offices. Dinoyo campus hosts the Faculty of Business, Faculty of Entrepreneurship, Faculty of Agricultural Technology, Faculty of Arts in Communication, and the Secretary Academy (Office Administration).
 The second campus in Kalijudan With open spaces and the presence of a garden pool, the atmosphere of the Kalijudan Campus is very beautiful and comfortable for lectures. This campus is also equipped with sports facilities such as basketball and tennis courts. Kalijudan campus hosts the Faculty of Engineering, and the Faculty of Teaching and Education.
 The third campus in Pakuwon City was established in 2013 and Located in a residential complex that is projected to be an independent city in the East Surabaya area, the campus at Pakuwon City Laguna was built with the concept of INTEGRATED HEALTH SCIENCES CAMPUS, which the concept of INTEGRATED HEALTH SCIENCES CAMPUS & EDUCATION refers to an integration of holistic health sciences, which includes mental and physical health. It is hoped that the existence of these Faculties in one campus will be able to facilitate the interaction of academicians in various educational, research and community service activities. One of them is the learning process in the form of interactive discussion activities across Study Programs. Through these joint activities students will have broad and multidisciplinary insights, not only in one discipline they have studied. Pakuwon campus host the Faculty of Medicine, Faculty of Pharmacy, Faculty of Nursing, Faculty of Psychology, and Faculty of Philosophy in one integrated campus and will equipped with a representative hospital.
 The Graha Widya Mandala campus Located in the same location as the Dinoyo Campus, Graha Widya Mandala is equipped with complete facilities and is convenient for use by the Widya Mandala Secretarial Academy. In this place there is also a Language Institute. Graha Widya Mandala campus host postgraduates programs, they are Master Program in Management, Master Program in Accounting, Master Program in English Education, Ph.D Program in Management.
 The campus in Madiun is an integration of Widya Mandala Madiun Catholic University in Madiun City, a potential area in the development of small and medium industries, as well as tourism and cultural wealth. Madiun campus hosts the Programs outside the main campus (Study Program Outside the Main Campus (PSKDU)), such Guidance and Counseling, Indonesian Language Education, Mathematics Education, English Literature, Biology, Industrial Engineering, Management, Accounting, Psychology, and Diploma (D-III) in Pharmacy.

Faculties and departments 
Diplomas (D-III) (Faculty of Vocational):
 Diploma Program (D-III) in Accounting
 Diploma Program (D-III) Secretary Academy (Office Administration)

UnderGraduates:
 Faculty of Business (Member of AACSB International)
 Department of Accounting
 Department of Management
 International Business Management (IBM) Program
 IBM Solbridge Joint Degree with the SolBridge International School of Business
 International Business Accounting (IBAcc) Program
 Digital Business Management (DBM) Program
 Faculty of Teaching and Education
 Department of Physics Education
 Department of English Education
 Department of Childhood Education Studies 
 Faculty of Pharmacy
 Department of Pharmacy
 Department of "Apoteker" Pharmacist (Apt.) specialization degree
 Faculty of Engineering
 Department of Chemical Engineering
 Department of Double Degree of Chemical Engineering is double-degree program with the National Taiwan University of Science and Technology
 Department of Electrical Engineering
 Department of Industrial Engineering
 Faculty of Agricultural Technology
 Department of Food Technology
 Faculty of Medicine
 Department of Medicine with a Medical Doctor (dr.) specialization degree
 Department of Doctor Profession
 Faculty of Psychology
 Department of Psychology
 Faculty of Nursing
 Department of Nursing
 Department of Ners (Ns.) specialization degree
 Faculty of Arts in Communication
 Department of Communication Sciences
 Faculty of Philosophy
 Department of Philosophy
 Faculty of Entrepreneurship
 Department of Entrepreneurship

PostGraduates:
 Master Program in Management
 Master Program in Accounting
 Master Program in English Education
 Master Program in Chemical Engineering
 Ph.D Program in Management

Partner institutions 
Widya Mandala Catholic University is a founding member of APTIK (Asosiasi Perguruan Tinggi Katolik) or the Association of Catholic Universities in Indonesia and a member of ASEACCU (Association of Southeast and East Asian Catholic Colleges and Universities). In addition, Widya Mandala Catholic University Surabaya is one of the few universities in Indonesia whose Business Faculty has a membership of the AACSB (Association of Advance Collegiate School of Business), an international accreditation organization for business studies programs based in Tampa, Florida, United States. This shows the internationally recognized quality of the Widya Mandala Catholic University study program in Surabaya.

Widya Mandala Catholic University is connected through partnership, institutions and alliances with universities in Australia, Europe, Asia, and North America. These alliances provide unparalleled access to new learning opportunities and student exchanges. UKWM has signed MoU and/or AOI collaborates on academic cooperation with several overseas universities, and institutions such as:
 Malaysia
 China
 Taiwan
 Australia
 Philippines
 East Timor
 United States
 Vietnam
 Thailand
 Canada
 United Kingdom
 Scotland
 Singapore
 Netherlands
 Finland
 South Korea
 Japan

Gallery

See also

Association of Christian Universities and Colleges in Asia (ACUCA)

References

External links

Christian universities and colleges
Educational institutions in Surabaya
Association of Christian Universities and Colleges in Asia
Universities in East Java
Educational institutions established in 1961
Private universities and colleges in Indonesia